It Never Rains may refer to:

It Never Rains..., a 1982 episode of Only Fools and Horses
"It Never Rains", the fifth and final track on Dire Straits' album Love over Gold
 "It Never Rains in Southern California", a 1973 song by Albert Hammond
 "It Never Rains (In Southern California)", a 1990 song by Tony! Toni! Toné!

See also
 When It Rains, It Pours (disambiguation)
 It Never Rains in Southern California (album), a 1972 record album by Albert Hammond
 It Never Rains in Southern California (compilation album), a 1996 album by Albert Hammond